Rinzi Lham (born 10 October 1967), is an archer who internationally represented Bhutan

Lham competed for Bhutan at the 1984 Summer Olympics held in Los Angeles in the individual event where she finished 44th.

Lham is the youngest Bhutanese competitor to compete at the Summer Olympics, she was 16 years and 304 days old.

References

External links
 

1967 births
Living people
Olympic archers of Bhutan
Archers at the 1984 Summer Olympics
Bhutanese female archers